The cellist of Sarajevo could refer to:
Vedran Smailović, a cellist who played during the Siege of Sarajevo
The Cellist of Sarajevo, a novel by Steven Galloway, inspired by Smailović